The Nevėžis is the sixth longest river in Lithuania and one of the main tributaries of the Nemunas. It is the second longest river in Lithuania, after the Šventoji, that flows exclusively within its borders. Its source is in the Anykščiai District Municipality, and the river first flows in a northwesterly direction, but then at Panevėžys turns towards the southwest, and passing Kėdainiai, flows into the Neman just west of Kaunas near Raudondvaris.

Name
There is a popular misconception that the name Nevėžis means "a river without crayfishes" because vėžys is the Lithuanian word for crayfish and ne means "no". In fact, the Nevėžis is known for its variety of fauna which include crayfish. Other ethimology suggested from proto-Baltic *nevēźā- (ex. Lithuainian ne-vežti 'not to carry') and means 'slow, not-conveying river'.  The Soviet-Belarusian geographer  suggested that the name Nevėžis could be derived from a Finnish word nevo meaning "swamp". The upper river has swampy banks.
 		 	
The river gave name to many things including Panevėžys, the fifth largest city in Lithuania. Its name means "[Town] near Nevėžis." FK Nevėžis and KK Nevėžis are also named after the river. The Nevėžis is important in Lithuanian culture because it flows through the middle of Lithuania. During the Middle Ages, the river was considered to be a natural border between two regions of Lithuania: Samogitia and Aukštaitija.

History

Natural environment

Nevėžis has about seventy tributaries. The largest are:
 left: Alanta, Juoda, Upytė, Linkava, Brasta, Žalesys, Alkupis, Obelis, Šerkšnys, Ašarėna, Barupė, Gynia; 
 right: Juosta, Kiršinas, Liaudė, Kruostas, Dotnuvėlė, Smilga, Šušvė (14th longest river in Lithuania), Aluona, Strūna.

In 1992, the Krekenava Regional Park was established in order to preserve the Middle Nevėžis ecosystem and natural surroundings. The park is unique because it breeds and tries to protect from extinction wisents, the European bison.

Even with two canals supplying Nevėžis with water, it becomes very shallow during a drier summer. Regularly it is between  4 and 9 meters deep. In more recent years, a number of grass carp was introduced to the river for aquatic weed control. The Nevėžis, due to its low level of water, slow current, and influx of the run-off of fertilizers from agriculture, was becoming more and more overgrown with weeds. It was hoped that the introduction of grass carp would help to control the process. Critics argued that the fish would not survive in the relatively cold climate. However, local fishermen still catch carp introduced several years ago.

Canals

The Nevėžis is connected with two other large rivers by canals. In order to reduce floods on the Lėvuo river, the Sanžilė Canal was dug in 1930. A draft to connect these rivers was first written in 1797. The location was very convenient: about 9,000 years ago Nevėžis was a tributary to Lėvuo. The land between the rivers was low and there was a small Sanžilė rivulet which could serve as the basis for the new canal. In the 19th century the Neman delta belonged to the Germans. This was an obstacle in trading. The Russian Empire was looking for ways to direct ships from the Neman directly to the port of Riga. The plan was abandoned because of insufficient funds. The idea was revisited again in 1914, the preparations for construction started but were interrupted by World War I. After reclaiming the origin of the Lėvuo, heavy rains would cause the flood of as many as twenty villages. It was decided to dig an 8 km length canal. In 1961-63 another canal connecting the Nevėžis with the Šventoji was finished. It is 12 km in length. There is a pumping station near Kavarskas to supply the canal with water.

References

  Krekenavos regioninis parkas (Krekenava Regional Park), Lithuanian State Department of Tourism, Ministry of Economy. Accessed May 20, 2006.
  Upių pertvarkymas (Betterment of Rivers), Lithuania: Electronic Encyclopedia, 2005, Šviesa. Accessed May 20, 2006.
  Petras Juknevičius, Laura Vasiliauskaitė, Sanžilė, Panevėžys district municipality, Panevėžys, 2003. Accessed May 20, 2006.
  Neringa Martinkutė, Nevėžio baltieji amūrai plušės be pamainos (Grass Carps Will Clean Nevėžis Non-Stop), Panevėžys Voice, Delfi.lt, May 12, 2006. Accessed May 20, 2006.
  Krašto istorija (History of the Land), Kėdainiai district municipality, 2005. Accessed May 21, 2006.

External links

 Niewiaża in the Geographical Dictionary of the Kingdom of Poland (1886) 
 Gallery of underwater pictures and video from Nevėžis
 Map of Nevėžis basin

Rivers of Lithuania
Nevėžis basin